"Mach" is a song by South Korean girl group Rainbow. The song was released on October 20, 2010, and was later included on their second mini album So Girls. The song is also the group's second Japanese single. It was released on December 7, 2011 in 4 different versions: 3 limited editions (CD+DVD, CD + 28-pages photobook and CD Only + Bonus track) and a regular edition.

Korean version

Background 
A teaser photo with the concept of the song was released in October 18. The song was released to follow up the promotions of the song "A". This version does not have a music video.

Track listing
{{track listing
| total_length    = 6:22
| headline        = Korean digital single:'| all_music       = Han Jae Ho and Kim Seung Soo
| title1          = Mach
| note1           = 마하; Maha| lyrics1         = Song Soo Yoon
| music1          = Han Jae-Ho, Kim Seung Soo
| length1         = 3:11
| title2          = Mach
| note2           = Instrumental
| music2          = Han Jae-Ho, Kim Seung Soo
| length2         = 3:11
}}

Composition
The song was produced by Sweetune (Han Jae Ho and Kim Seung Soo) and written by Song Soo Yun, who also produced their previous single "A".

Chart performance

South Korea
The song debuted at number 38 in the first week and climbed to the number 19 on the following week, which is currently the highest peak of the song. The song ranked at number 193 on Gaon's Yearly chart with 216,200,537 points and with 925,573 digital copies sold.

Charts

Korean version

 Japanese version 

The Japanese version follows the same concept of the Korean version. A teaser of the music video was released on November 15, 2011, on Universal Music Japan's YouTube account. The full music video premiered on November 21 on the TV station Space Shower TV.

Composition
the lyricist of Japanese version : Natsumi Watanabe, Yu Shimoji and NICE73. The B-side is a Japanese version of the song "Not Your Girl", previously released in Korean, on their debut EP Gossip Girl''.

Chart performance

Japan
The physical single debuted at the number 9 on Oricon's weekly chart with 15,506 copies sold in the first week.

Track listing

Charts

Oricon

Other charts

Release history

External links
 "Mach" (Japanese) Music Video teaser on YouTube

References

2010 songs
2010 singles
2011 singles
Rainbow (girl group) songs
Korean-language songs
Japanese-language songs